Philadelphia is a town in Jefferson County, New York, United States. The population was 1,947 at the 2010 census, down from 2,140 in 2000.

The town contains a village also called Philadelphia. Both are in the northeastern part of Jefferson County.

History 
The area was first settled circa 1804. A grist mill was built in 1804 on the Indian River, adjacent to the north side of the large waterfall in the village. The town was formed in 1821 from part of the town of Le Ray. In 1872, the community of Philadelphia set itself off from the town by incorporating as a village.

In 1959, the Indian River Central High School opened, serving students from the towns of Philadelphia, Theresa, Antwerp, Leray, and Pamelia.

The Sterlingville Archeological District was listed on the National Register of Historic Places in 1995.

Geography

Transportation
U.S. Route 11 is a northeast–southwest highway that crosses the center of the town. New York Route 26 progresses north from Philadelphia towards Alexandria Bay, and south to Vestal.

The town had been the junction for several branches of the Rome, Watertown and Ogdensburg Railroad. Branches went north to Clayton, Ogdensburg and Massena Springs, and they went south to Niagara Falls, Syracuse, Rome and Utica. The successor railroad, the New York Central Railroad, last ran passenger trains through the town from Massena to Syracuse in 1964. The New York Central's successor, CSX Transportation still transports freight by rail through Philadelphia.

Climate

Demographics

As of the census of 2000, there were 2,140 people, 759 households, and 582 families residing in the town. The racial makeup of the town was 88.93% White, 4.91% Black or African American, 0.61% Native American, 1.17% Asian, 0.09% Pacific Islander, 2.06% from other races, and 2.24% from two or more races. Hispanic or Latino of any race were 4.16% of the population.

There were 759 households, out of which 45.5% had children under the age of 18 living with them, 60.6% were married couples living together, 11.3% had a female householder with no husband present, and 23.2% were non-families. 19.5% of all households were made up of individuals, and 10.1% had someone living alone who was 65 years of age or older. The average household size was 2.82 and the average family size was 3.20.

In the town, the population was spread out, with 33.7% under the age of 18, 10.1% from 18 to 24, 32.0% from 25 to 44, 15.7% from 45 to 64, and 8.5% who were 65 years of age or older. The median age was 29 years. For every 100 females, there were 96.9 males. For every 100 females age 18 and over, there were 93.6 males.

The median income for a household in the town was $31,250, and the median income for a family was $35,909. Males had a median income of $29,605 versus $21,121 for females. The per capita income for the town was $13,555. About 12.2% of families and 13.8% of the population were below the poverty line, including 17.2% of those under age 18 and 15.5% of those age 65 or over.

Notable person
 Cassius Marcellus Coolidge (1844-1934), known today for his famous paintings of Dogs Playing Poker, was born in Philadelphia and lived there or in nearby Antwerp for much of his adult life.

Philadelphia cream cheese
When cream cheese first appeared in the United States around 1870, it was produced in small batches by many farmers in New York. Because of its origin, it eventually became legend that Philadelphia brand cream cheese was named for Philadelphia, New York. In actuality, Philadelphia Cream Cheese was named for Philadelphia, Pennsylvania, because at the time the city was associated with high-quality dairy products.

Communities within Philadelphia 
Fort Drum – The military reservation occupies the southeastern third of Philadelphia.
Philadelphia (originally "Quaker Settlement") – A village near the center of the town on US-11.
Pine Plains – A location in the southern part of the town, near Sterlingville.
Rogers – A location in the southern corner of the town, south of Strickland Corners on County Road 30.
Shurtleff Corners – A location on the northwestern town line, northwest of Philadelphia village on NY-26.
Sterlingville – A former hamlet in the southern corner of the town.
Strickland Corners – A location in the southern corner of the town on County Road 30, northwest of Sterlingville.
Whitney Corners – A location on County Road 20, west of Philadelphia village.

External links
 Town of Philadelphia official website

References

Towns in Jefferson County, New York
Populated places established in the 1800s